Matheran is an automobile-free hill station and a municipal council in the Karjat taluka of the Raigad district located in the Indian state of Maharashtra. Matheran is part of the Mumbai Metropolitan Region, and one of the smallest hill stations in India. It is located in the Western Ghats, at an elevation of around 800 m (2,625 feet) above sea level. It is about 90 km from Mumbai, and 120 km from Pune. This proximity to these urban areas makes it a weekend getaway for many. Matheran, which means "forest on the forehead" (of the mountains) in Marathi, is an eco-sensitive region, declared by the Ministry of Environment, Forest and Climate Change, Government of India. It is Asia's only automobile-free hill station.

There are many hotels and Parsi bungalows in the area. Old British colonial architecture is preserved in Matheran. The roads are made of red laterite earth.

History 

Matheran was identified by Hugh Poyntz Malet, the then district collector of Raigad district in the May of 1850. Lord Elphinstone, the then Governor of Bombay laid the foundations of the development as a future hill station. The British developed Matheran as a getaway from the regional summer heat. It is also the birthplace of freedom fighter Veer Bhai Kotwal.

The Matheran Railway

The railway was inspected by UNESCO officials, but failed to make it to the list of the World Heritage Sites. India's other Hill Railways like the Darjeeling Railway, the Kangra Valley Railway, Nilgiri Mountain Railway are already on the list.

The Toy train was shut down for the most part in 2016 and 2017. It became re-operational since 26 January 2018 and was e-inaugurated by the then Chief Minister of Maharashtra, Mr. Devendra Fadnavis. However, it was temporarily suspended again after a landslide in the 2019. Thereafter, it operates shuttle rides between Aman Lodge and Matheran Station on an hourly basis.

Soil and rocks 
Geographically the rock types are solely composed of Deccan trap with inter trappeans of Cretaceous, Eoceuerage and laterites of a still younger age. The rock is basalt, which has given rise to secondary alteration known as laterite. The laterite predominates the hills and almost covers the hilltops. This makes the hard exposed surfaces of the laterite show red gravelly earth. The soil has a vermicular or pisolitic structure and contains a large amount of water. There is little soil cover over most of the hilltop. The topmost layer of rock is a soft porous iron-clay, through which there is drainage of water by the beginning of summer.

Forest and vegetation 

Semi-evergreen forests are present in the Matheran. The trees are evergreen, making the plateau forests very dense and even congested in places. The laterite, porous soil along with very heavy rainfall mixed with dense fog has resulted in unique flora rich in diversity on the plateau. The forests show vegetation in top, middle and ground storeys. The trees form a cover over a large variety of shade loving herbs, climbers, ferns and mosses. The forests of Matheran have attracted many botanists: Smyth J.Y.(1871), Birdwood H.M. (1886) and (1896), Cooke T. (1887–1901), Woodrow G.M. (1897–1901), Irani N.A.(1962), Satyanarayann & Mudliar (1959), Vartak, V.D.(1966), Kothari & Moorthy (1993). A good collection of the dried plants is deposited in the Blatter Herbarium, St. Xavier's College, Bombay, Mumbai. Matheran has a huge number of medicinal plants and herbs. It was declared an Eco-Sensitive zone (ESZ) by the Union Environment Ministry on 4 February 2003. The declaration as ESZ has led to the stoppage of developmental activities and construction of hazardous industries.

List of trees reported to be found in Matheran 

The vegetation of the area depends on the type and depth of the soil. Due to poor soil depth, the vegetation on the edges of the plateaus is poor. Due to heavy rainfall, dissected hilly terrain and excessive leaching of the soil, the exposed areas become less fertile and become less moisture retentive, resulting in shallow rooted vegetation. It is required to plant trees to protect the soil cover from losing its valuable humidity and fertility. The winds are very strong and blow from west or southwest during monsoon and also dry winds blow during the three months from January to March. These winds tend to shear and bend the plants while absorbing their moisture.

Wildlife 

The town also has a large monkey population, including bonnet macaques and Hanuman langurs. Domesticated horses for riding are also in large numbers and are one of the icons of Matheran. Inside the forests, animals like barking deer, Malabar giant squirrels, foxes, wild boars, mongooses can be found. But these animals are rare in numbers compared to the monkeys and usually do not venture to places with human activity.

Leopard Sightings

There have been reports of leopard sightings in Matheran a few times in last decade. Leopards are not known to dwell in Matheran however. Dense forests in the valleys surrounding Matheran have been suspected of housing them. Their dwindling population in India however has led their sightings to be extremely rare nowadays. There have been zero reported incidents of leopard attacks in Matheran.

Demographics 
As of the 2001 India census, Matheran had a population of 5139. Males constituted 58% of the population and females 42%. Matheran had an average literacy rate of 71%; male literacy being 75%, and female literacy being 66%. In Matheran, 11% of the population was under 6 years of age. Languages spoken include Marathi, Hindi, and English.

Geography and Climate 
It has an average elevation of 800 m (2,625 ft) above sea level. Lying in an elevated region, it has a cooler and dryer climate relative to its surroundings, which makes it popular during the summer months. Temperatures range from 32°C (90°F) to 16 °C (61 °F).

October to November 
The monsoon retreats prior to this time period, making the temperature cool, but not humid. Such weather facilitates sightseeing.

December to February 
The winter months are cool with the temperature usually staying above 11 °C. While the days are mostly sunny, evenings and early mornings tend to get a bit chilly. Couples prefer this time period to visit Matheran for their honeymoons.

March to May 
The temperatures can go over 35 °C during the day. However, tourists do not report displeasure despite the tempereature.

June to September 
This time period sees heavy rainfall in Matheran.

Transportation 
Matheran is connected to Mumbai (100 km) & Pune (120 km) by rail and road, with the closest railway station being in the foothill town of Neral. The nearest airport is the Chhatrapati Shivaji International Airport, Mumbai.

Rail 
Matheran has a narrow gauge railway station in the town center. The old Matheran Hill Railway offers several daily trains to Neral. 

The toy train is connected to the mainline rail route at the Neral Junction. Mini train or toy train service started between Neral and Matheran from 22nd October 2022 . The train between the Aman lodge and Matheran is also in place at intervals of approximately every hour having approximately 85 seats. 

Presently 2 up and 2 down train service has been started.

The first train starts at 850am from Neral, second train is at 220pm. You will reach Matheran at 1130am and 5pm respectively.

Matheran to Neral trains are at 245pm and 420pm that will reach Neral at 530pm and7pm respectively.

Road 
There is a taxi service available from the Neral railway station till Aman Lodge, while bus services are available from the railway stations of Neral and Karjat both. No automobiles except for a Municipality operated ambulance are allowed inside Matheran.

Non-automobile transportation 
Ahead of Aman Lodge, the only available transport facilities are horses and hand-pulled [[Pulled rickshaw are available

Emerging solutions 
The Municipality has expressed its interest in permitting electronic rickshaws beyond Aman Lodge as well. However, this has seen opposition from many Matheran locals. Despite this, test trials for the above solution have been granted authorization by the Municipality.

Places of Interest 
Altogether, there are 40 points, two lakes, two parks, four major worship places and a race course to visit in Matheran.

Viewpoints 
The following are some of the major viewpoints on Matheran:
 Alexander Point
Rambaug Point
 Little Chowk Point
 Big Chowk Point
 One Tree Hill Point
 Belvedere Point
 Lord's Point
 Celia Point
 Echo Point
 Monkey Point
 Porcupine Point (also known as Sunset Point)
 Panorama Point (also known as Sunrise Point)
 Khandala Point
 Madhavji Point
 Louisa Point
 Myra Point
 Maria Point
 Garbett point: This is the least visited point in Matheran as it is very far away from central Matheran, when compared to the other points. The vast green stretch of Garbett plateau serves as a major attraction during monsoon.

Historical places of interest 
 Forts: The hill station has two medieval forts in its close proximity, them being Prabalgad and Pebkilla. The Vikatgad fort is also a trekking destination, which is connected to the hill hosting Matheran itself.
 Horse Race Courses: Olympia Race Course (established in 1892–93 by Sir Dhunjibhoy Bomanji).
 The Matheran railway Station

Religious Places of interest 
 Pisarnath Temple
 Matheran Shiv Mandir

Lakes 
The water to the Matheran is supplied from Lake Charlotte. This dam overflows during monsoon, making it a tourist attraction.

Parks 
The "Paymaster park" at Matheran is maintained by the local Municipality. Games for children and pagodas are organised here .

Trekking Routes 
Matheran has various trekking routes, reported to be easy to traverse over by tourists:

Sunset Point Route 
This route starts from Dodhani village and ends at the Sunset Point at Matheran. This is the most popular route for trekkers.

2) Garbett Point Route 
This route starts from "Sagachiwadi", a small tribal village near the Dhom dam. This is the second most popular route.

3) Rambaug Point Route 
This route goes from Rambaug point to a small village called Pokharwadi near Chowk village. The route passes through a waterfall during the rainy season. There is a view of the Morbe Dam's backwater while going through this route.

4) One Tree Hill Route 
The route's base village is the Ambewadi village. Ambewadi is near Pokharwadi, where the route to Rambaug point begins. There is a view of the Morbe Dam's backwater while going through this route.

5) Vikatgad Route 
This is reported to be the most difficult trekking route of Matheran. It starts from the base village Mamdapur and takes about 3 hours to reach Matheran via the Vikatgad fort.

All treks have been reported to take between 2 and 3 hours to be completed. The Rambaug Point and One Tree Hill routes are usually not taken by any trekkers nowadays.

Gallery

References

External links 

 Matheran Hill Railway Schedule at India Rail Info
 Neral to Matheran Light Train Timetable
 Fresh attempts to get heritage status for Matheran Light Rail – Indian Express (14 January 2013)
  Matheran A Practical Guide by Shailendra Patil and published by Rainbow Adventures.

Tourism in Maharashtra
Hill stations in Maharashtra
Cities and towns in Raigad district
Mountains of the Western Ghats
Tourist attractions in Raigad district